Thermogutta is a thermophilic genus of bacteria from the family of Planctomycetaceae.

See also 
 List of bacterial orders
 List of bacteria genera

References

Bacteria genera
Planctomycetota